Robert Williams (11 February 1767 – 10 March 1847) was an English banker and politician. He purchased the Bridehead estate near Dorchester, Dorset, around 1797. It comprised the manor of Littlebredy, Bridehead being a name fabricated by Williams, and in later years became the main family residence.

He was elected an alderman (1796–1801) and sheriff of London for 1797–8. He was prime warden of the Goldsmiths’ Company in 1810–11, director of the Hope Assurance Company in 1820 and chairman of the company from 1826 to 1841. During the time of the French Revolutionary and Napoleonic Wars, he served as an officer in the Cornhill Volunteers, from Captain in 1797, to Lieutenant Colonel commandant in 1799, and later served in the London and Westminster Light Horse from 1803 to 1807.

Williams was the Member of Parliament (MP) for Wootton Bassett from 1802 to 1807. On 17 March 1808 he was elected MP for Grampound after the previous election had been declared void on 7 March 1808. However he and John Teed were unseated on petition on 10 May 1808 in favour of George Augustus Frederick Cochrane the previous member and William Holmes. Williams was then elected MP for Kilkenny City from 1809 to 1812, and for Dorchester from 1812 to 1835

He married Frances Turner of Putney. His eldest son was Robert Williams (1811–1890).

References

External links 
 

1767 births
1847 deaths
English accountants
UK MPs 1807–1812
UK MPs 1812–1818
UK MPs 1818–1820
UK MPs 1820–1826
UK MPs 1826–1830
UK MPs 1830–1831
UK MPs 1832–1835
UK MPs 1802–1806
UK MPs 1806–1807
UK MPs 1831–1832
Members of the Parliament of the United Kingdom for County Kilkenny constituencies (1801–1922)
Members of the Parliament of the United Kingdom for English constituencies
Sheriffs of the City of London
Members of the Parliament of the United Kingdom for constituencies in Cornwall